Głubczyce  ( or sparsely Glubčice,  or Gubczycy, Silesian German: Lischwitz) is a town in Opole Voivodeship in southern Poland, near the border with the Czech Republic. It is the administrative seat of Głubczyce County and Gmina Głubczyce.

Geography
Głubczyce is situated on the Głubczyce Plateau (a part of the Silesian Lowlands) on the Psina (Cina) river, a left tributary of the Oder.

History

Middle Ages
The settlement named Glubcici was first mentioned in an 1107 deed. At the time, it was a small village, dominated by a large wooden castle. It stood on the right bank of the Psina River, which according to an 1137 peace treaty between the dukes Soběslav I of Bohemia and Bolesław III of Poland formed the border between the Moravian lands (then ruled by the Bohemian dukes) and the Polish province of Silesia. The exact date of the city foundation is unknown, but it is traceable back to 1224, when the town called Lubschicz held toll rights obtained from the Přemyslid king Ottokar I. 

However, in 1241 the town was devastated during the Mongol invasion. During the city's rebuilding, the left bank of the Psina was also settled, and in 1270 city rights were confirmed by King Ottokar II of Bohemia. During this time, a wall was built around the city, complete with watchtowers and a moat. A large parish church was also constructed in the town, which had been assigned by King Ottokar II to the Order of Saint John  in 1259. After his defeat in the 1278 Battle on the Marchfeld, the town privileges were acknowledged by King Rudolf I of Germany. Ottokar's widow Kunigunda of Halych had a hospital erected, run by the Knights Hospitaller who established a commandry here. In 1298, the town received expanded rights from King Wenceslaus II. The privileges granted to the citizens were to serve as an example for other towns in the years that followed.

From about 1269, Hlubčice was part of the Moravian Duchy of Opava (Troppau), ruled by a cadet branch of the Bohemian Přemyslid dynasty since Nicholas I, a natural son of King Ottokar II, had received the lands from the hands of his father. Upon the death of Nicholas' son Duke Nicholas II and the division of the duchy of Opava between his heirs, in 1377, the town became the residence of Nicholas III who ruled as a Duke of Głubczyce. The town remained the seat of the Opava branch of the Přemyslids until the last Duke John II entered a Franciscan cloister in 1482. Upon his death three years later, his duchy was seized as a reverted fief by King Matthias Corvinus and transferred to the control of the Duchy of Krnov (Jägerndorf, Karniów) and the city finally lost its status as a residence.

Modern Era

While the Krnov principality was acquired by the Hohenzollern margrave George of Brandenburg-Ansbach in 1523, the Protestant Reformation reached the town. George had married Beatrice de Frangepan, the widow of Matthias Corvinus' son John; he and his son George Frederick tried to exert Hohenzollern influence in the Lands of the Bohemian Crown which from 1526 onwards were ruled by the Catholic House of Habsburg. In 1558, a Lutheran church and school were built in Głubczyce. In response to this, Franciscans and Jews were expelled from the city. During the Thirty Years' War, the city was completely destroyed, most devastatingly by Swedish forces in 1645.

After the Silesian Wars, the city came under the rule of Prussia in 1743. Leobschütz was incorporated into the Province of Silesia by 1815 and became the administrative seat of a Landkreis (district). In the 18th century, Leobschütz belonged to the tax inspection region of Neustadt. In 1781, the town's population stood at only, 2,637. In order to accommodate the city's expansion, parts of the city's wall were torn down. The population stood at 4,565 in 1825, and 9,546 in 1870. After World War I and the creation of the Republic of Poland, the Silesian plebiscite was held in Upper Silesia. The percentage of 99.5% of Leobschütz citizens voted for Germany. The Silesian Uprisings did not directly affect the city, which had almost exclusively German-speaking inhabitants.

After the Nazi seizure of power in 1933, the town hosted schools and training grounds for both the SS and the SA paramilitary forces, becoming the honorary centre of the Nazi Party in the Prussian Province of Upper Silesia. The town's synagogue was burned down in 1938, the same year as Kristallnacht. During World War II, the Germans operated three forced labour subcamps (E247, E376, E766) of the Stalag VIII-B/344 prisoner-of-war camp in the town. After the Vistula–Oder Offensive, on 18 March 1945, Red Army troops began a siege of the city, which was resisted by the 18th SS Panzergrenadier Division (Tank grenadiers) and the 371st Wehrmacht division. The siege ended on March 24, and the Soviet forces occupied the town. Approximately 40 percent of the town was destroyed in the siege or by Red Army troopers plundering in the first weeks of the occupation.

After the Soviet occupation, the name of the town was changed to Głubczyce, a more modern version of its historic Polish name Głupczyce. The town was transferred, like most of Silesia, to the re-established Republic of Poland according to the 1945 Potsdam Agreement. Also in accordance to the Potsdam Agreement, the remaining German population was expelled. New Polish settlers, some of whom refugees transferred from the Kresy in the Soviet-annexed former Polish eastern territories, made the town their home. Claims to the Głubczyce territory were raised by the Czechoslovak Republic, which even sent troops to the area in June 1945. The border dispute around Głubczyce was eventually settled in 1958 with the Czechoslovak-Polish border agreement. The town became the seat of a Polish county, or powiat, in 1946. Głubczyce lost that distinction in 1975, but regained it in 1999.

Economy

The town of Głubczyce's economy is based around the agricultural sector and food production. Formerly, during the Polish People's Republic, the industry of fibre production developed in the settlement ("Unia", "Piast" manufacturers). In modern days, the fibre manufacturing industry is near non-existent. Other industries located in Głubczyce including heating machinery production ("Galmet" and "Electromet").

Population

Climate

Sports
The local football club is Polonia Głubczyce. It competes in the lower leagues.

Notable people
Karl Bulla (1855 or 1853 – 1929), German photographer, "father of Russian photo-reporting"
Max Filke, composer
Joachim Gnilka, theologist and biblical critic
Heinrich Emanuel Grabowski (1792–1842), German botanist and pharmacist
Felix Hollaender, writer and dramatist
Gustav Hollaender (1855–1915), German violinist, conductor and composer
Otfried Höffe, philosopher
Erwin Félix Lewy-Bertaut, crystallographer
Wolfgang Nastainczyk (1932–2019), German theologian
Paul Ondrusch, sculptor
 Johannes Reinelt, poet and author (1858–1906), born in the nearby village of Kreuzendorf (Gołuszowice)
 Moritz Schulz (1825–1904), German sculptor
 Gerhard Skrobek, sculptor
 Gustav Veit (1824–1903), German gynecologist and obstetrician 
 Przemysław Wacha, badminton player
 Stefanie Zweig, writer

Twin towns – sister cities
See twin towns of Gmina Głubczyce.

Gallery

References

External links
 Municipal website 
 Leobschuetz committee 
 Jewish Community in Głubczyce on Virtual Shtetl

Cities in Silesia
Cities and towns in Opole Voivodeship
Głubczyce County